In astronomy, star names, in contrast to star designations, are proper names of stars that have emerged from usage in pre-modern astronomical traditions. Lists of these names appear in the following articles:

 List of Arabic star names
 List of proper names of stars: traditional proper names in modern usage around astronomy
by constellation
in alphabetical order  
 Stars named after people
 Traditional Chinese star names

Names